Ntchisi Airport  is an airport serving the town of Ntchisi, Republic of Malawi.

See also
Transport in Malawi
List of airports in Malawi

References

 Google Earth

External links
 OpenStreetMap - Ntchisi
 Ntchisi Airport
 OurAirports - Ntchisi

Airports in Malawi